Pritzier is a municipality  in the Ludwigslust-Parchim district, in Mecklenburg-Vorpommern, Germany.
The municipality Pritzier consists of three villages: Pritzier, Pritzier Bahnhof and Schwechow.

Geography
Pritzier is located north western of the area called Griese Gegend in the south west of
Mecklenburg-Vorpommern

Adjacent to pritzier there is the protected area Mecklenburg Elbe Valley Nature Park.

History
In 1302 Graf Nikolaus of Schwerin donated the ownership of the village Pritzier to his town
Crivitz to enlarge its parish land.

In the late 14th century Pritzier was owned by the Ritter von Scharpenberg.
Joachim of Lützow possessed the manor Pritzier about 1616/17.
The still existing manor house has been built from 1820 to 1825.
Until 1945 it was owned by the family von Könemann. After the end of World War II the house gave quarters for refugees.
Later the house was an administrative building of the peoples owned manor Pritzier.
In the year 1996 house and adjacent parks were reprivatized.
As of today the manor house is in use as a residential building.

Politics

Coat of arms

The coat of arms of Pritzier has been approved by the ministry of the interior
of Mecklenburg-Vorpommern on 24 April 2007.
Its number of registration in the roll of arms is 311.

The coat of arms design has been created by Karl-Heinz Steinbruch a heraldry
specialist living in Schwerin.

Infrastructure

Transportation
In the middle of the village Pritzier the Bundesstraße 5 is crossing the Bundesstraße 321.

A train station at railway line between Schwerin/Ludwigslust and Hamburg is located in Pritzier Bahnhof
about two kilometres outside the main village of Pritzier.

Public transport bus service is available as well.
There are two lines - line 520 (Boizenburg-Vellahn-Hagenow) and line 565 (Hagenow-Lübtheen-Kaarßen) of the Ludwigsluster Verkehrsgesellschaft.

Fire brigade
Pritzier got an auxiliary fire brigade. In 2007 it had its 60th anniversary.

Health
The closest hospital near Pritzier is located in Hagenow.

Economy
Pritzier is surrounded by agricultural areas utilized for farming. There are large fruit plantations and acres mainly used for crops, corn and fodder beets.
Also there is a large stable for dairy cattle.

In the village Schwechow there is a well known distillery for schnapps and liqueur made from various fruits like apples, cherries, pears and even more exotic ones like ananas and carambola.

Sports
In Pritzier there is a playing field for sports like soccer.
In 1999 the SV Pritzier-Schwechow 49 e.V. (formerly known as Traktor Pritzier-Schwechow) had its 50th anniversary.

Places of interest

 manor house
 neogothic church (it replaced 1852 an old church existing from at least 1230)

References

Ludwigslust-Parchim